Varshavka is a rural locality (a village) in Shaymuratovsky Selsoviet, Karmaskalinsky District, Bashkortostan, Russia. The population was 105 as of 2010. There are 4 streets.

Geography 
Varshavka is located 6 km northwest of Karmaskaly (the district's administrative centre) by road. Karmaskaly is the nearest rural locality.

References 

Rural localities in Karmaskalinsky District